Kuyanovo (Quyan) is a rural locality (a selo) and the administrative centre of Kuyanovsky Selsoviet, Krasnokamsky District, Bashkortostan, Russia. The population was 3,664 as of 2010. There are 23 streets.

Geography 
Kuyanovo is located 51 km southeast of Nikolo-Beryozovka (the district's administrative centre) by road. Redkino is the nearest rural locality.

References 

Rural localities in Krasnokamsky District